Tarleton Academy is a secondary Academy situated in Tarleton, Lancashire, England; the head is Simon Day, appointed April 2021. The school caters for 11 to 16-year-olds. The academy is scheduled a complete building renewal to be completed in September 2023, with a total cost of 23 million pounds.

Facilities
The school has its own swimming pool facilities, which the school operates itself and are used by local primary schools. In 2003, the school secured a £850,000 bid to build a new sports hall, after going 30 years without one. The sports hall can accommodate four badminton courts, and was completed in 2004.

Academy status
In late November 2011, as part of the school's conversion to Academy status, the Governing Body announced that the school would be renamed as Tarleton Academy from January 2012.

Notable former pupils
Gary Ablett - footballer
Gavin Blyth - Journalist/ Emmerdale producer

References

External links
 

Schools in the Borough of West Lancashire
Educational institutions established in 1973
Secondary schools in Lancashire
1973 establishments in England
Academies in Lancashire